Fat'h Ul Mueen is a textbook on Fiqh dealing with the Shafi'i school of Islamic jurisprudence authored by a Malayali Alim, Zainuddin Makhdoom II.

Islamic jurisprudence
16th-century Indian books
Indian non-fiction books
Indian religious texts